Kastoria (Kastoriá ) is a city in northern Greece in the region of Western Macedonia. It is the capital of Kastoria regional unit, in the geographic region of Macedonia. It is situated on a promontory on the western shore of Lake Orestiada, in a valley surrounded by limestone mountains. The town is known for its many Byzantine churches, Byzantine and Ottoman-era domestic architecture, its lake and its fur clothing industry.

Name 
The city is first mentioned in 550 AD, by Procopius as follows: "There was a certain city in Thessaly, Diocletianopolis by name, which had been prosperous in ancient times, but with the passage of time and the assaults of the barbarians it had been destroyed, and for a very long time it had been destitute of inhabitants; and a certain lake chances to be close by which was named Castoria. There is an island in the middle of the lake, for the most part surrounded by water; but there remains a single narrow approach to this island through the lake, not more than fifteen feet wide. And a very lofty mountain stands above the island, one half being covered by the lake while the remainder rests upon it." Although Procopius refers to it as "a city of Thessaly", the description is undoubtedly that of Kastoria, a city on a promontory in a lake.

There are several theories about the origin of the name Kastoria. The dominant of these is that the name derives from the Greek word κάστορας (kástoras, meaning "beaver"). Trade in the animal's fur, sourced from nearby Lake Orestiada, has traditionally been an important element of the city's economy. Other theories propose that the name derives from the Greek word κάστρο (kástro, meaning "castle"; from the Latin word castra) or from the mythical hero Κάστωρ (Kástōr), who may have been honoured in the area. The word is sometimes written with a C, Castoria, especially in older works. From Greek, the name was borrowed into Turkish as Kesriye. The Bulgarian, Macedonian and Serbian name of the city is Kostur (Cyrillic: Костур).

Municipality
The municipality Kastoria was formed at the 2011 local government reform by the merger of the following 9 former municipalities, that became municipal units:
Agia Triada
Agioi Anargyroi
Kastoria
Kastraki
Kleisoura
Korestia
Makednoi
Mesopotamia
Vitsi

The municipality has an area of 763.330 km2, the municipal unit 57.318 km2.

Districts
Apózari
Doltsó
Dailaki (Myloi)
Doplitsa
Kato Agora
Kallithea
Lyv

Main streets
Palaiologou Street
Nikis Avenue
Christopoulou Street
Kyknon Avenue
Orestion
Orestiados
Megalou Alexandrou
Kapodistria
Ifaistou

History

Antiquity 

Kastoria is believed to have ancient origins. Livy (XXXI, XL) mentions a town near a lake in Orestis, called Celetrum, whose inhabitants surrendered to Sulpitius during the Roman war against Philip V of Macedon (200 BC). The ancient town was possibly located on a hill above the town's current location.

The Roman Emperor Diocletian (ruled 284–305 AD) founded the town of Diocletianopolis in the vicinity. Procopius (De aedificiis, 4.3.1–4) relates that, after Diocletianopolis was destroyed by barbarians, Emperor Justinian relocated it on a promontory projecting into Lake Orestiada, the town's current location, and "gave it an appropriate name", perhaps indicating that he renamed it Justinianopolis. Th. L. Fr. Tafel, in his study on the Via Egnatia (De via militari Romanorum Egnatia, 1832), suggested that Celetrum, Diocletianopolis and Kastoria are three successive names of the same place.

Middle Ages 

Kastoria itself does not appear, however, until the Byzantine–Bulgarian wars of the late 10th/early 11th century (the mention of Diocletianopolis in Constantine Porphyrogennetos' De Thematibus is anachronistic, drawing from the 6th-century Synecdemus). The town was in Bulgarian hands until 1018, when it was conquered by Basil II.

Kastoria was occupied by the Normans under Bohemond I in 1082/83, but was soon recovered by Alexios I Komnenos. The town had a significant Jewish presence, most notably the 11th-century scholar Tobiah ben Eliezer.

During the 13th and 14th centuries, the town became contested between several powers and changed hands often. The Second Bulgarian Empire held the city under Kaloyan and Ivan Asen II, until it was recovered by the Despotate of Epirus. The Nicaean Empire captured it in ca. 1252, but lost it again to Epirus in ca. 1257, only for the Nicaeans to recapture it following the Battle of Pelagonia (1259).

In the early 14th century, Kastoria was part of the domain of John II Doukas, "doux of Great Vlachia and Kastoria". After his death, the town became part of the semi-autonomous domain of Stephen Gabrielopoulos. After the latter's death in 1332/3, the Byzantine emperor Andronikos III Palaiologos took over the town, but in the very next year (1334) it was surrendered briefly to the Serbs by the renegade Syrgiannes Palaiologos.

The Serbian ruler Stephen Dushan finally captured Kastoria in 1342/3, taking advantage of the ongoing Byzantine civil war, and made it part of his Serbian Empire. After Dushan's death, Kastoria became the seat of Symeon Uroš.

The town came later under the Epirote ruler Thomas Preljubović, and finally under the Albanian Muzaka family, until it was conquered by the Ottoman Empire in the mid-1380s.

Ottoman era 

The Ottoman Turks conquered Kastoria around 1385, but it is unclear whether by force or by an agreement with its Albanian rulers. During the Ottoman period Kastoria acquired a sizeable Muslim population and a number of mosques and tekkes could be found in the city. Kursum Mosque is the only one standing to this day. In 1519 (Hijri 925) the town of Kastoria was inhabited by Muslims and Christians. It had 67 Muslim and 732 Christian households and it was a zeamet of Chamberlain Mehmed Bey and the Infantry commander of Thessaloniki Hızır. The town also had Voynuks.

According to the findings of Vasil Kanchov, at the turn of the 20th century, the town had 3.000 Greek Christians, 1.600 Turkish Muslims, 750 Jews, 300 Bulgarian Christians, 300 Albanian Christians, and 240 Roma, for a total of 6190 inhabitants. According to the findings of Dimitri Mishev, the town had a population of 4.000 Greek Christians,  400 Bulgarian Patriarchist Grecomans and 72 Vlachs in 1905 (excluding the Muslim population).

The city would remain under Ottoman rule (as part of Manastir Vilayet in the late 19th and early 20th century) until the First Balkan War (1912), when Greece took it. The 1913 treaties of London and Bucharest incorporated Kastoria into the Greek state. Following the end of the First World War the bulk of the Muslim element of Kastoria's population was expelled to Nevşehir, Niğde, and Yozgat in Turkey during the population exchange between Greece and Turkey in 1924.

Doltsó and Apózari 

During the Ottoman times, Kastoria attracted a multitude of people from across the Balkans and beyond, resulting in a diverse, multi-ethnic community. As a result, the city plan was radically transformed. The different ethnic communities, Bulgarian, Turkish, Greek and Jewish, became centred around separate neighbourhoods or ‘quarters’. Two old Greek lakeside quarters, the “Doltso” (Dolcho) and “Apozari” neighbourhoods, are among the best-preserved and last remaining traditional quarters of the city.

These neighbourhoods are characterised by the rich stock of old houses preserved in the shape of autonomous historic buildings, such as the important private mansions or the more humble folk dwellings (‘accessory’ buildings) built between the 17th and 19th centuries. During this time, the processing and exporting of animal furs to Europe created wealth, and city mansions, of particular architectural and decorative value, were built. This interconnected nexus of churches and private houses constitutes a rare example of a Byzantine and post-Byzantine township, and remains inhabited to this day.

The traditional buildings and manor houses of the “Doltso” and “Apozari” neighbourhoods are threatened by modern development in the city, as well as structural degradation from poor levels of conservation. These sites were included on the 7 Most Endangered list of Europe's most at-risk monuments and sites in 2014.

Interwar period
The Greek census (1920) recorded 6,280 people in the town and in 1923 there were 829 inhabitants (or 242 families) who were Muslim. Following the Greek-Turkish population exchange, in 1926 within Kastoria there were refugee families from East Thrace (19), Asia Minor (101) and Pontus (1). The Greek census (1928) recorded 10,308 town inhabitants. There were 137 refugee families (588 people) in 1928.

World War II 
During both World War II and the Greek Civil War, the town was repeatedly fought over and heavily damaged in the process. It was nearly captured by the Communist Democratic Army of Greece in 1948, and the final battles of the civil war took place on the nearby Mount Gramos in 1949.

The first Jewish community was a community of Romaniote Jews. One of them was Tobiah ben Eliezer. In 1940 the Jewish population in Kastoria numbered 900, composed predominantly of Ladino-speaking Sephardic Jews. Many family names were of Italian origin as a result of emigrations (originally from Spain) via Italy in the 17th and 18th centuries.

In late March 1944, under Nazi German occupation during World War II, 763 Kastorian Jews were taken prisoner by Nazi troops and sent to Auschwitz-Birkenau, as part of a program of deliberate extermination of Jews during the Holocaust. Kastoria was liberated by the guerrillas of the Greek People's Liberation Army less than 4 months after the Jewish citizens were forced to the concentration camps. By the end of the war in 1945, only 35 of the original population had survived, the vast majority of the community having been killed in concentration camps.

In 2016, a special documentary titled "Trezoros: The Lost Jews of Kastoria" was released with never before seen footage.  It has been created by executive producer and director Lawrence Russo (based on his parents' story) and co-director and producer Larry Confino.

Economy

Kastoria is a popular tourist destination and an international centre of fur trade, having taken so the nickname the city of the fur traders. Tourism and the fur industry dominate the local economy. Indeed, (as mentioned above) the town was possibly named after one of the former staples of the trade – the European beaver (kastóri in Greek), now extinct in the area. Trading in mink fur now predominates and every year an international showcase of fur takes place in the city. Fur trade is the biggest factor of Kastoria economy and it started back to the 14th century when the city provided the ermine pelts for the lining of the robes of the Byzantine courtiers. Early traders settled in Russia and Germany. After Germany's division at the end of World War II, the fur center moved from Leipzig to Frankfurt. During the Greek Civil War in the late 1940s, thousands of Kastorians migrated to the United States to take the place of aging Jewish immigrants who had formed the core of New York furriers. In 1984, 25,000 Kastorians were working and living in the area of New York, and 10,000 in Frankfurt.

Now there are more than 300 small and big dealers in fur in Kastoria. Other industries include the sale and distribution of locally grown produce, particularly wheat, apples, wine and fish. Recently a large shopping center has been built in the city of Kastoria. Kastoria has 16 local radio stations, 2 TV stations, 5 daily newspapers and 7 weekly ones. The town's airport is named Aristotelis Airport.

Landmarks

Religious sites

Kastoria is an important religious centre for the Greek Orthodox Church and is the seat of a metropolitan bishop. The Metropolis of Kastoria is one of the metropolises of the New Lands in Greece, administered as part of the Church of Greece. Kastoria originally had 72 Byzantine and medieval churches, of which 54 have survived, including St Athanasius of Mouzaki. Some of these have been restored and provide useful insight into trends in Late Byzantine styles of architecture and fresco painting.

Kastoria used to have two Bektashi tekkes and three Bektashi türbes. The first was situated at the entrance to the town on the road from Florina and was said to be particularly "ancient" and formerly important. It suffered during the 1826 persecution. Its chief saint, buried there, was one of the early Bektashi missionaries named Kasim Baba who is said to have lived during the time of Turkish conquest and, according to folk history was a "posthumous miracle worker" and converted many local Christians by causing a huge rock to crash into the local church. However this tekke was suppressed under a Sunni crackdown in the 19th century. Another notable tekke was located at Toplitza, near the barracks, and contained a turbe with the grave of a local notable Sandjakdar Ali Baba. There was also a turbe on the outskirts of the gypsy quarter to Aydin Baba.

Museums
The Museum of Byzantine History located on Dexamenis Square houses many examples of Byzantine iconography. The Costume Museum and the Monuments Museum are also located in the city. In the village of Kastanofyto lies the Folklore Museum (Kastanofyto), which preserves folk traditions from the local area.

Kastoria is filled with old manors dating to the Ottoman period, while parts of the old Byzantine walls also stand.

Bridges
Stone bridges are an important part of the traditional architecture of Kastoria. The best known is the bridge of Zouzouli, the bridge of Koromilia, the Koutsoumpli bridge and the bridge in Beriki.

The Bridge of Zouzouli, located in a remote area on the southern tip of the prefecture of Kastoria, is built over the waters of the stream of Zouzouli and connects mt. Smolikas with mt. Voio. It is  arched, has a length of 25 meters and a height of 7 meters. Constructed  in 1880 by artisans coming from Konitsa. The construction was financed from either a man, in memory of his brother who drowned in the river, or from a ruler who, moved by the drowning of a little girl, wanted to build the bridge.

The bridge of Koutsoumpli is located between the mountains of Voio and Smolikas, over the river of Zouzouli and it previously connected the villages of Eptachori and Zouzouli. Its arch is 14 meters wide, 8 meters high and it has a total length of 33 meters and a width of 2.40 meters.

The bridge in Beriki has a very thin arch and a great height. It was manufactured by master builder Sdrolios, who came from the village of Dendrochori, probably in 1866. Next to the bridge there was possibly a watermill and an inn. Probably, this is where the name of the region came from (inn Beriki).

The bridge of Koromilia is built over the Ladopotamos river and it used to connected the village of Koromilia with the one of Dendrochori. It is arched and has a length of 26 meters, a width of 2.80 meters, a height of 7 meters and an arch opening of 16 meters. It was built in 1865 and consists of limestone and schist slate.

Education
The School of Sciences of University of Western Macedonia with two departments (Informatics and Mathematics) is based in the city, as well as the departments of Communication and Digital Media and Economics.

Cuisine

Local specialities include:

Giouvetsi (meat with pasta in tomato sauce)
Garoufa (Grivadi soup)
Pestrofa (trout)
Sarmades (meatballs wrapped with pickled cabbage)
Makálo (meatballs with garlic sauce)
Kolokythopita (pumpkin pie)
Kremmydopita (onion pie)
Milk Pie (dessert)
Sáliaroi (dessert)

Sports

Kastoria FC is the city's football team. It was established in 1963 when three local sides joined to form one stronger team to represent Kastoria. The team's most successful years to date were in 1974 when they were promoted to the Greek first division and competed there for a year, and in 1979–1980 when they won the Greek Cup after an impressive 5–2 victory over Iraklis FC in the final.

Rowing: London 2012 Olympic Games: Giannis Christou , Christina Giazitzidou

Brazil 2016 Olympic Games: Giannis Christou

Population

Location

Climate
Kastoria has a humid subtropical climate (Cfa). As a result of the moderating effect of the lake, it records less extreme temperatures than the rest of Western Macedonia.

Notable people 

Tobiah ben Eliezer (11th), author of the Midrash Lekach Tov
Pavlos Argyriadis (1849–1901), journalist, lawyer and anarchist/socialist intellectual
Argyrios Vouzas (1857–?), doctor and revolutionary
Şefik Aker (1877–1964), military officer in the Ottoman and Turkish armies
Athanasios Christopoulos (1772–1847), poet
Konstantinos Michail, scholar
Vasileios Hatzis, painter
Aristotelis Zachos, architect
Georgios Theocharis (1758–1843), merchant, revolutionary and diplomat
Emmanuel bros, partners of Rigas Feraios; executed with him in 1798
Leonidas Papazoglou, photographer
Andreas Tzimas, communist politician
Ioannis Christou, (1983–), Greek rower
Dimitris Diamantidis (1980–), basketball player
Christina Giazitzidou (1989–), Olympic bronze medalist in rowing
Jagnula Kunovska (1943–), politician, jurist and writer
Nicholas Lambrinides, founder of Skyline Chili, a famous restaurant chain in Cincinnati, USA
Qazim Baba, 15th century Ottoman-Albanian bektashi holy man.
Sevastos Leontiadis (1690–1765), educationalist
Lucas Samaras (1936–), artist
Maria Spiropulu (1970–), experimental physicist

International relations

Twin towns — sister cities
Kastoria is twinned with:
 Enna, Italy
 Kyiv, Ukraine (since 1998)
 Plovdiv, Bulgaria (since 2005)

Gallery

See also 
 Castoria (titular see) (Latin Catholic)
 Metropolis of Kastoria (now Greek Orthodox)
 Delinanios Folklore Museum
 Byzantine Museum of Kastoria
 Paleontological and Paleobotanical Museum of Nostimo, a village  from Kastoria
Kastorianos, folk dance from Greek Macedonia

Notes

External links

 Official municipal website (English version under construction)
 Official website of the Prefecture
 Informational Portal for Kastoria
 Kastoria Byzantine Museum
 Dispilio Lakeside Neolithic Settlement
 Byzantine Kastoria through its monuments (10th–14th centuries)
Kastoria
Kastoria in visitwestmacedonia.gr

 
Byzantine sites in Greece
Greek prefectural capitals
Municipalities of Western Macedonia
Populated places in Kastoria (regional unit)